John Zabrucky (born 1947/1948) is an American prop designer and co-founder of Modern Props, Inc., a prop design and rental company that produced and distributed props for film and television productions. Through Modern Props, Zabrucky contributed props to such films as Ghostbusters (1984) and RoboCop (1987), as well as films and TV series in the Star Trek franchise. Zabrucky is known for designing a prop apparatus sometimes dubbed "the most important device in the universe", due to its appearances in over 100 films and TV series.

Early life and education
Zabrucky was born in Warren, Ohio. His mother was Italian. He attended Turner Junior High School and studied for one year at Youngstown State University. He earned his bachelor's degree at Kent State University (KSU) and began teaching art classes there, as well as at the University of Akron and the Mansfield Reformatory. Zabrucky won awards from the Cleveland Museum of Art and the Art Directors Club of New York in 1972 and 1974, respectively. Dissatisfied with the graphic design program at KSU that was required for his master's degree, he decided to move to Los Angeles, California, with his then-girlfriend, set decorator Linda DeScenna.

Career

1974–1977: Establishing Modern Props, Inc.
After their move to Los Angeles, Zabrucky and DeScenna's relationship ended, though they remained friends. Zabrucky reportedly found himself working "horrible" jobs like assembling scuba diving equipment, and collecting food stamps. After witnessing a prop malfunction while waiting for DeScenna on a Warner Bros. lot one day, he told a producer that he could easily build superior props to the one that malfunctioned; this led to a meeting in which the producer introduced Zabrucky to the prop design and rental business. Zabrucky began building props from home for TV series such as Quark and Buck Rogers in the 25th Century. In 1977, with an $18,000 investment from a friend, Zabrucky co-founded Modern Props, Inc. alongside John Mark Robinson and Michael Ladish. That year, the company moved out of Zabrucky's home and into a  facility in Inglewood.

1979–2000: Success in film and television
The first film that Zabrucky provided props for was Meteor (1979). The following year, he served as art director and casting director for the music video for the Devo song "Whip It". Around that time, Zabrucky shared an apartment in Los Angeles with Devo members Gerard and Bob Casale.

Zabrucky designed the communicators and other props seen in Star Trek II: The Wrath of Khan, as well as the eyeball fabrication machine seen in Blade Runner (both 1982). During the production of the 1984 film Ghostbusters, Zabrucky created a prop device in partnership with an outside fabricator; he presented it to the Ghostbusters propmaster, and the prop became the PKE meter seen in the finished film. Zabrucky also constructed props for Rocky IV (1985); RoboCop (1987), for which he built a mechanical recharging chair; Back to the Future Part II (1989); Batman Returns (1992); Speed (1994); and Independence Day (1996). By the mid-1990s, Zubrucky oversaw a  facility in Culver City with 58 employees.

By 2003, Modern Props was known for supplying props for science fiction productions, as well as modern furniture for productions featuring everyday homes.

2008–2020: Decline and closure of Modern Props
Despite the launching of a satellite office in Vancouver, Modern Props struggled as a result of the Great Recession, during which Zabrucky laid off almost half of his staff and shortened the workweek for the remaining employees. Other challenges included the increased use of computer-generated (CG) effects and sets in films and TV series, as well as the popularity of reality television programming, which utilizes few props.

Around 2014, he accepted an offer to sell the space in Culver City, and relocated to a  facility in San Fernando. Citing the growth of films and TV series being shot outside of California and utilizing CG effects and sets over physical props, Zabrucky decided to close Modern Props in late 2019. By May 2020, he had auctioned off the majority of the furniture and props rented out by Modern Props.

"The most important device in the universe"
A prop machine designed by Zabrucky and rented out to film and TV productions by Modern Props is sometimes called "the most important device in the universe", as a result of its many appearances in science fiction films and TV series. The apparatus in question was built for the TV series The Incredible Hulk (1977–1982), and features two long, glass tubes that glow red, orange, and yellow, as well as a control panel outfitted with buttons and dials. The device has appeared in multiple episodes of Star Trek: The Next Generation (1987–1994) and the film Austin Powers: The Spy Who Shagged Me (1999), as well as over 100 other films and TV series.

Personal life
Zabrucky is married. He and his wife own two homes: one in Pacific Palisades, Los Angeles, and another in Apulia, Italy. As a pastime, Zabrucky creates large-scale, three-dimensional aluminum and steel sculptures, often featuring futuristic and steampunk elements along with anti-war themes.

Filmography

Films

Television series

Music videos
 "Whip It" by Devo (art and casting director)

Works featuring "the most important device in the universe"
 The Incredible Hulk (1977–1982)
 Knight Rider (1982–1986)
 Airplane II: The Sequel (1982)
 The Last Starfighter (1984)
 Star Trek: The Next Generation (1987–1994)
 Austin Powers: The Spy Who Shagged Me (1999)

References

External links
 
 

People from Warren, Ohio
Prop designers
American set decorators
American people of Italian descent
Science fiction artists
1940s births
Living people